Denmark competed at the 1952 Summer Olympics in Helsinki, Finland. 129 competitors, 115 men and 14 women, took part in 73 events in 15 sports.

Medalists

Athletics

Boxing

Canoeing

Cycling

Road Competition
Men's Individual Road Race (190.4 km)
Hans Andresen — 5:11:18.5 (→ 8th place)
Jørgen Frank Rasmussen — 5:14:09.4 (→ 19th place)
Wedell Østergaard — 5:22:34.1 (→ 37th place)
Helge Hansen — 5:27:08.8 (→ 52nd place)

Track Competition
Men's 1.000m Time Trial
Ib Vagn Hansen
 Final — 1:14.4 (→ 6th place)

Men's 1.000m Sprint Scratch Race
Ove Krogh Rants — 12th place

Men's 4.000m Team Pursuit
Bent Jørgensen, Jean Hansen, Knud Andersen, Preben Lundgren Kristensen, and Henning R. Larsen
 Eliminated in quarterfinals (→ 6th place)

Diving

Equestrian

Dressage

Eventing

Fencing

12 fencers, 9 men and 3 women, represented Denmark in 1952.

Men's épée
 Mogens Lüchow
 René Dybkær
 Raimondo Carnera

Men's team épée
 Raimondo Carnera, Erik Swane Lund, René Dybkær, Mogens Lüchow, Ib Nielsen, Jakob Lyng

Men's sabre
 Palle Frey
 Raimondo Carnera
 Ivan Ruben

Men's team sabre
 Paul Theisen, Raimondo Carnera, Ivan Ruben, Palle Frey, Jakob Lyng

Women's foil
 Karen Lachmann
 Ulla Barding-Poulsen
 Kate Mahaut

Football

 First round

 Second round

 Quarter finals

 Team roster
 Poul Andersen, B 93
 Steen Blicher, AB
 Jens Peter Hansen, Esbjerg fB
 Jørgen W. Hansen, KB
 Jørgen Johansen, KB (goalkeeper)
 Knud Lundberg, AB
 Svend Nielsen, B 93
 Poul Petersen, AB
 Poul Erik Petersen, Køge BK
 Holger Seebach, AB
 Erik Terkelsen, Esbjerg fB
 Reserve: Søren Andersen, Esbjerg fB
 Reserve: Henry From, AGF
 Reserve: Ralf Ginsborg, Hellerup IK
 Reserve: Carl Holm, B 1903
 Reserve: Aage Rou Jensen, AGF
 Reserve: Knud Blak Jensen, KB
 Reserve: Per Knudsen, AGF
 Reserve: Jørgen Olesen, AGF
 Reserve: Jens Torstensen, Odense KFUM
Head coach: Axel Bjerregaard

Gymnastics

Rowing

Denmark had 25 male rowers participate in six out of seven rowing events in 1952.
Men

Sailing

Open

Shooting

Five shooters represented Denmark in 1952.
Men

Swimming

Men

Women

Weightlifting

Men

Wrestling

References

External links
Official Olympic Reports
International Olympic Committee results database
Danish Football Association

Nations at the 1952 Summer Olympics
1952
Summer Olympics